Kress Independent School District is a public school district based in Kress, Texas (USA) that serves students in southern Swisher County.

Schools
The district has two campuses - 
Kress High/Junior High School (Grades 7-12)
Kress Elementary (Grades PK-6)

In 2009, the school district was rated "academically acceptable" by the Texas Education Agency.

References

External links
Kress ISD

School districts in Swisher County, Texas